"I Don't Know Where I'm Going But I'm On My Way" is a World War I era song, in which a soldier leaving to fight sings that "Uncle Sammy is calling me, so I must go." It was written and composed by George Fairman, recorded by both the Peerless Quartet and Henry Burr, and produced by Harry Von Tilzer Music Publishing Company in 1917.
The song stayed in the top 20 from September 1917 to January 1918 and hit number 9 in December 1917.

Lyrics

References

1917 songs
Songs of World War I